Olenyok Airport  is a public use airport in Olenyok, Sakha (Yakutia) Republic, Russia.

Airlines and destinations

References

Airports in the Arctic
Airports in the Sakha Republic